The 1931–32 SK Rapid Wien season was the 34th season in club history.

Squad

Squad and statistics

Fixtures and results

League

Cup

References

1931-32 Rapid Wien Season
Rapid